Christina "Tina" Barrett (born June 5, 1966) is an American professional golfer who played on the LPGA Tour.

Barrett won once on the LPGA Tour in 1989.

College 
While at Longwood, Barrett won the Honda-Broderick Award (now the Honda Sports Award) for golf, only the second Division II player to win this award.

Professional wins (1)

LPGA Tour wins (1)

LPGA Tour playoff record (0–2)

References

External links

American female golfers
LPGA Tour golfers
Golfers from Maryland
College women's golfers in the United States
Longwood University alumni
Sportspeople from Baltimore
1966 births
Living people
21st-century American women